The Wisconsin Dragons were a team of the Women's Football Alliance who played for the 2011, 2012, 2018 and 2019 seasons.  The Dragons were based in southeastern Wisconsin and they played their home games at various stadiums in the Milwaukee area. The team was retired after the 2019 season, with a cumulative record of 9-19.

References

External links 
 Wisconsin Dragons official website

Women's Football Alliance teams
Sports in Milwaukee
American football teams in Wisconsin
American football teams established in 2010
2010 establishments in Wisconsin